Cristiano Scazzola (born 20 July 1971) is an Italian football coach and former player, last in charge as head coach of Serie C club Piacenza.

Playing career
A Genoa youth product, Scazzola made his professional debut in a 1990–91 Coppa Italia game against Roma. He successively left Genoa to pursue a long career in the lower divisions, starting with Massese (Serie C1) in 1991. He made his Serie B debut in 1996, in what was a short comeback of his at Genoa. He left professional football in 2006 after a short stint with Pisa to join Vercelli-based amateurs Pro Belvedere, with whom he served as captain in the club's historical Serie D promotion in 2009. He retired in 2010, aged 39, after a Serie C2 season in which he served contemporaneously as both player and assistant head coach.

Coaching career
After retirement, Scazzola accepted a youth coach position at the club after it merged with and changed denomination to Pro Vercelli. In 2012, he took charge of the Primavera under-19 club at the club, and in 2013 he was named new head coach for the club's 2013–14 Lega Pro Prima Divisione campaign.

In his first season as a head coach, Scazzola succeeded in guiding Pro Vercelli to second place in the league, behind champions Virtus Entella, and then won the promotion playoffs to bring his club swiftly back to Serie B. He was successively confirmed as head coach of Pro Vercelli for the 2014–15 Serie B season.

As head coach of a newly promoted Serie B club, Scazzola was also successfully admitted to the yearly UEFA Pro Licence course to be held in Coverciano.

On 19 January 2020, he was dismissed by Serie C club Alessandria.

On 26 January 2021, he was hired by Serie C club Piacenza. He parted ways with Piacenza on 20 May 2022, after guiding the club to escape relegation by the end of the 2020–21 season and a mid-table placement in the following one. On 3 October 2022, he was re-hired as Piacenza manager. He was sacked on 18 February 2023 after failing to lead Piacenza out of the direct relegation zone.

References

1971 births
Living people
Italian football managers
Italian footballers
Serie B players
Genoa C.F.C. players
U.S. Massese 1919 players
Spezia Calcio players
U.S. Fiorenzuola 1922 S.S. players
Modena F.C. players
Calcio Lecco 1912 players
U.S. Alessandria Calcio 1912 players
A.C. Monza players
F.C. Lumezzane V.G.Z. A.S.D. players
A.S.D. Calcio Ivrea players
Pisa S.C. players
F.C. Pro Vercelli 1892 players
Sportspeople from the Province of Savona
Association football midfielders
F.C. Pro Vercelli 1892 managers
U.S. Alessandria Calcio 1912 managers
Piacenza Calcio 1919 managers
Serie B managers
Serie C managers
Footballers from Liguria